Kelvin Wopi (born 2 March 1995) is an Indonesian professional footballer who plays as a defender for Liga 2 club Persipura Jayapura.

Club career

Perseru Serui
Kelvin joined Perseru Serui for a match in the 2016 Indonesia Soccer Championship A.

References

External links
 Kelvin Wopi at Soccerway
 Kelvin Wopi at Liga Indonesia

1995 births
PSIS Semarang players
Perseru Serui players
Indonesian footballers
Liga 1 (Indonesia) players
Badak Lampung F.C. players
Association football defenders
Living people
People from Yapen Islands Regency
Sportspeople from Papua